Nahal Oz (lit. "Mighty Stream" or "Mighty Nahal") is a kibbutz in southern Israel. Located in the northwestern part of the Negev desert close to the border with the Gaza Strip and near the development towns of Sderot and Netivot, it falls under the jurisdiction of Sha'ar HaNegev Regional Council.

History
The kibbutz was founded in 1951 as the country's first Nahal settlement. It was initially referred to as Nahlayim Mul Aza (lit. Nahal soldiers across from Gaza). In 1953 it became a civilian community.

In April 1956, the kibbutz security officer Ro'i Rothberg was ambushed and killed by infiltrators from Gaza. Rutenberg's funeral was attended by Moshe Dayan, then Chief of Staff, who gave a widely acclaimed eulogy which called upon Israel to search its soul and probe the national mindset.
"Early yesterday morning Roi was murdered. The quiet of the spring morning dazzled him and he did not see those waiting in ambush for him, at the edge of the furrow. Let us not cast the blame on the murderers today. Why should we declare their burning hatred for us? For eight years they have been sitting in the refugee camps in Gaza, and before their eyes we have been transforming the lands and the villages, where they and their fathers dwelt, into our estate. It is not among the Arabs in Gaza, but in our own midst that we must seek Roi's blood. How did we shut our eyes and refuse to look squarely at our fate, and see, in all its brutality, the destiny of our generation? Have we forgotten that this group of young people dwelling at Nahal Oz is bearing the heavy gates of Gaza on its shoulders? Beyond the furrow of the border, a sea of hatred and desire for revenge is swelling, awaiting the day when serenity will dull our path, for the day when we will heed the ambassadors of malevolent hypocrisy who call upon us to lay down our arms. Roi's blood is crying out to us and only to us from his torn body. Although we have sworn a thousandfold that our blood shall not flow in vain, yesterday again we were tempted, we listened, we believed.
We will make our reckoning with ourselves today; we are a generation that settles the land and without the steel helmet and the cannon's maw, we will not be able to plant a tree and build a home. Let us not be deterred from seeing the loathing that is inflaming and filling the lives of the hundreds of thousands of Arabs who live around us. Let us not avert our eyes lest our arms weaken. This is the fate of our generation. This is our life's choice - to be prepared and armed, strong and determined, lest the sword be stricken from our fist and our lives cut down. The young Roi who left Tel Aviv to build his home at the gates of Gaza to be a wall for us was blinded by the light in his heart and he did not see the flash of the sword. The yearning for peace deafened his ears and he did not hear the voice of murder waiting in ambush. The gates of Gaza weighed too heavily on his shoulders and overcame him."

Privatization of the kibbutz began in 1997.

After the 2006 Lebanon War, Israeli novelist David Grossman, who lost his son in the war, delivered a eulogy that was  compared to Dayan's eulogy for Rutenberg. On 22 August 2014 during Operation Protective Edge, four-year-old resident of the kibbutz Daniel Tregerman was killed by mortar fire from the Gaza Strip.

Economy
The kibbutz's agriculture is based on crop growing, a dairy and chickens. It also has a factory ("Ozat") for producing nuts and bolts, as well as a high-tech firm.

References

External links
Nahal Oz Negev Information Centre

Kibbutzim
Kibbutz Movement
Sha'ar HaNegev Regional Council
Populated places established in 1951
Nahal settlements
Gaza envelope
Populated places in Southern District (Israel)
1951 establishments in Israel